The 2019 Vancouver Whitecaps FC season was the club's ninth season in Major League Soccer, the top division of soccer in the United States and Canada. Including previous iterations of the franchise, this was 42nd season of professional soccer played in Vancouver under a variation of the "Whitecaps" name.

On November 7, 2018, the Whitecaps named Marc Dos Santos as their fourth head coach since joining MLS.

Outside of the MLS, the Whitecaps participated in the 2019 Canadian Championship. They lost 2–1 on aggregate to Cavalry FC in the third round.

Current roster

Transfers

In

Out

Major League Soccer

Preseason

Regular season

League tables

Western Conference

Overall

Results

Matches

Canadian Championship

Playing statistics

Appearances (Apps.) numbers are for appearances in competitive games only including sub appearances
Red card numbers denote:   Numbers in parentheses represent red cards overturned for wrongful dismissal.

References

Vancouver Whitecaps
Vancouver Whitecaps
Vancouver Whitecaps
Vancouver Whitecaps FC seasons